Allison Pang is the writer of the Abby Sinclair urban fantasy series published by Pocket Books and the ongoing Fox & Willow webcomic at Sad Sausage Dogs. Pang previously worked as a marine biologist.

Bibliography

Abby Sinclair UF series 
 A Brush of Darkness 
 A Sliver of Shadow 
 A Trace of Moonlight 
 Carniepunk: A Duet with Darkness (Prequel short story)

The IronHeart Chronicles 
 Magpie’s Song

Fox & Willow 
 Came a Harper
 To the Sea
 Blinded by the Light
 The Better to See You With

References

External links
Allison Pang Homepage
Allison Pang Facebook Page
Allison Pang Google+ Page

21st-century American novelists
Year of birth missing (living people)
Living people
American women novelists
21st-century American women writers